Andishkadeh Yaghin with former name of Doctrinal Analysis Center for Security without Borders also Known as Center for Doctrinal Strategic Studies is an Iranian Nonprofit non-governmental organization allegedly Revolutionary Guards-affiliated Think tank directed by Hassan Abbasi.

The strategy of serve strategic assets in either deterring or striking at the West and also to derail domestic attempts to dilute the Islamic Republic’s revolutionary legacy is apparent in the work of the Think tank. Its mission is to develop the Islamic Republic's Doctrine for countering internal and foreign threats in the coming Century.

According to a faculty of the Think tank, Andishkadeh use Modern Structure models of TRADOC and Collège de France, and also Traditional model of Safavid Era's Hawza.

References

Sources 
Articles
 

Books
 
 
 

Papers

External links 

 
 
 
 

2000 establishments in Iran
Research institutes established in 2000
Research institutes in Iran
Think tanks based in Iran